Events from the year 1772 in Sweden

Incumbents
 Monarch – Gustav III

Events
 February - The pamphlet Det Olyckliga Swenska Fruentimrets Böneskrift till Allmänheten by Anna Maria Rückerschöld, counted as one of the first feminist publications in the women's issue in Sweden.
 29 May – Coronation of King Gustav III and Queen Sophia Magdalena in Stockholm.
 29 May – The Order of Vasa is created. 
 June - Johan Christopher Toll arrive in Scania to prepare a coup d'état. 
 July - Jakob Magnus Sprengtporten arrive in Finland and take hold of the Sveaborg Fortress in preparation of a coup d'état. 
 12 August – Rebellion in Scania. 
 16 August – Rebellion in Finland. 
 19 August – Revolution of 1772: King Gustav III stages a coup d'état against the parliament in Stockholm with the support of Hovpartiet. 
 21 August – King Gustav III forces the parliament to accept the Swedish Constitution of 1772. 
 22 August – Joachim von Düben resign as President of the Chancellor. 
 23 August – Ulrik Scheffer appointed President of the Chancellor.
 26 August – King Gustav III formally abolish torture, and the Rose Chamber in Nya smedjegården and the Thief Cellar in the Town Hall, is closed.  
 September – The legal manufacture of Brännvin for personal use is banned because of the crop's failure. 
 9 November  – A Pawnbroker of the state is founded in Stockholm. 
 2 December - Foundation of the Royal Physiographic Society in Lund.
 8 December  - The Sahlgrenska University Hospital is founded. 
 - Widespread famine in Sweden following widespread crop failures in 1771 continuing in 1772, particularly in the middle and southern parts of the country. 
 - The Royal Swedish Academy of Letters, History and Antiquities resume its activity. 
 - Gustafs skål by Carl Michael Bellman.
 - The Stenborg Company performs before the King, who wish to reinstate a Swedish language theater at Bollhuset.
 - The permit to engage in Tobacco trade is foremost to be granted to (widowed and married) women in need to support themselves.
 - Royal Patriotic Society is founded.
 - First issue of Hwad Nytt?? Hwad Nytt??

Births

 9 February – Frans Michael Franzén, poet  (died 1847)
 25 April – Louis Deland, ballet dancer (died 1823)
 7 June - Aurora Liljenroth, scholar  (died 1836)
 10 June – Greta Naterberg, folk singer (d. 1818)
 3 November – Carl Löwenhielm, diplomat (died 1861)
 22 November – Lars Hjortsberg, actor (died 1843)
 14 December – Wendela Gustafva Sparre, textile artist and a member of the Royal Swedish Academy of Arts (died 1855)
 Unknown date - Euphrosyne Löf, ballet dancer, actress, courtesan and royal mistress (died 1868)
 Louise Götz, actress

Deaths

 29 March - Emanuel Swedenborg, scientist, philosopher, theologian, revelator, and mystic (born 1688)
 Jeanne Du Londel, actor (born 1706)

References

 
Years of the 18th century in Sweden
Sweden